Ratanpar is a Town/Residential Area in the Surendranagar City of the Indian state of Gujarat. 

Ratanpar's Postal Index Number code is 363020 and the postal head office is Surendranagar.

References 

Villages in Surendranagar district